Neukieritzsch is a municipality in the Leipzig district, in Saxony, Germany. On 1 April 2008, the former municipality of Lobstädt was incorporated into Neukieritzsch.  On 1 July 2014, the former municipality of Deutzen was incorporated into Neukieritzsch.

Geography and Transport 
Neukieritzsch lies in the Leipzig Basin approximately 25 km south of Leipzig and 9 km north west of Borna.

Demographics

Historical Population 
Population (as of 31 December each year):

 Data: Statistical Office of Saxony

Economy and Infrastructure 

Neukieritzsch station is situated on the Leipzig–Hof railway of the Saxon Bavarian Railway Company and the Neukieritzsch–Chemnitz railway, as well as the former Neukieritzsch–Pegau railway.

References 

Leipzig (district)